Bilgili is a Turkish surname. Notable people with the surname include:

 Burak Bilgili (born 1974), Turkish opera singer
 Serdar Bilgili (born 1963), Turkish businessman

Turkish-language surnames